WinShell is a freeware, closed-source multilingual integrated development environment (IDE) for LaTeX and TeX for Windows.

WinShell includes a text editor, syntax highlighting, project management, spell checking, a table wizard, BibTeX front-end, Unicode support, different toolbars, user configuration options and it is portable (e.g. on a USB drive).
It is not a LaTeX system; an additional LaTeX compiler system for Microsoft Windows (such as MiKTeX or TeX Live) is required.

Languages
Supported languages are Brazilian Portuguese, Catalan, Chinese, Czech, Danish, Dutch, English, French, Galician, German, Hungarian, Italian, Japanese, Mexico Spanish, Polish, Portuguese, Russian, Serbian, Spain Spanish, Swedish and Turkish.

Interoperability

WinShell works with the MiKTeX, the TeX Live and the W32TeX distribution. At first start, WinShell recognizes the distribution and sets the command-line arguments automatically. Similarly with the viewer for the generated PDF documents. For Acrobat Reader, WinShell closes the PDF document before compiling. For SumatraPDF, WinShell automatically sets the correct commands to achieve forward and inverse search between WinShell and SumatraPDF.

See also
Comparison of text editors
Crimson Editor, an open-source Windows editor
List of text editors
LyX, an open-source cross-platform editor and shell
Texmaker, an open-source cross-platform editor and shell
TeXnicCenter, an open-source Windows editor and shell
WinTeXShell, opensource TeX editor for Windows http://www.projectory.de/texshell/

References

External links

TeX editors
Windows-only freeware